Some soldiers of the coalition forces have refused to participate in the Iraq War. The following is a list of the more notable military personnel who have refused to participate in the Iraq War, broadly categorized by the reasons they themselves give.

Objectors who moved to Canada

Legal and political
Pursuant to the Treaty between the Government of Canada and the Government of the United States of America on Mutual Legal assistance in Criminal Matters, US authorities can request Canadian authorities to identify, locate, and take into custody of US nationals who have committed a crime that carries a possible sentence of more than a year and subsequently extradite them back to US, pursuant to Extradition Treaty Between the United States of America and Canada. However, the government of the United States must promise those extradited will not receive the death penalty, in accordance with the ruling of United States v. Burns from the Supreme Court of Canada.

Because of the possibility that deserters have been issued with arrest warrants back in the United States and pursuant to those two agreements above, they are liable for arrest in Canada unless they legalize their status. This can be done by pursuing a refugee claim, about which the Immigration and Refugee Board of Canada (IRB) will hold a hearing and determine the validity of the claim. If refused, the claimant can appeal to the Federal Court, Federal Court of Appeal, and finally the Supreme Court of Canada, if leave is granted.

However, if the refugee claim is refused and subsequent appeals do not overturn the decision made by IRB, the claimant must leave Canada within 30 days under a removal order. If the claimant does not leave Canada within 30 days or failed to confirm departure details with Canada Border Services Agency, it automatically becomes a deportation order, enforceable by any peace officer in Canada.

Objectors who remain in Canada

List from these references: and public information sourced from List of Resister Profiles at "Courage to Resist" website which gives evidence that these military personnel are refusing to participate in the Iraq war.

Justin Colby
Dan Felushko (has dual citizenship with the U.S. and Canada)
Patrick Hart
Brandon Hughey (refugee status declined by IRB)
Peter Jemley
Christian Kjar
Dale Landry 
Kevin Lee
Brad McCall
Phil McDowell
David Sanders
Kyle Snyder
James Stepp
Dean Walcott
Rodney Watson – On August 5, 2009 he was ordered out of Canada by August 10, 2009, but this was delayed to August 19, 2009. It was again delayed to September 11, 2009. In light of this order of deportation, he appealed to the First United Church in Vancouver for right of asylum. His request was granted and he entered that church on September 18, 2009.
Chuck Wiley

Objectors granted stay of deportation pending further decisions

Corey Glass – On July 9, 2008, the Toronto Star reported that Corey Glass "is [now] permitted to remain in Canada until the Federal Court makes a decision on ... cases for judicial review."  He was transferred to the IRR where he remains under Army jurisdiction until they discharge him.
Jeremy Hinzman
Matt Lowell (October 27, 2008 and January 6, 2009)

Objectors granted new IRB panel to reconsider applications for permanent refugee status

("IRB" is Immigration and Refugee Board of Canada)
Joshua Key – On July 4, 2008, Joshua Key won a Federal Court appeal, thus forcing the Refugee Board to re-examine his claim. Joshua Key will have a new hearing in front of the Immigration and Refugee Board. The Canadian Broadcasting Corporation's July 4, 2008, coverage of the story said that there is now a possibility that he "could qualify as a refugee". On June 3, 2009, Key had a new hearing in front of the Immigration and Refugee Board.

Objectors deported from Canada or left because of deportation order

Objectors who had applied for legal refugee status
Robin Long – On July 16, 2008, the Toronto Star reported that Long "was ordered out of [Canada] last week after he failed to comply with bail conditions imposed when he missed an immigration hearing last year. He was deported yesterday."
Chris Teske – January 23, 2009, Teske was the first war resister to be forced out of Canada who applied for legal refugee status, did not "fail to comply with bail conditions" (as Robin Long did), and yet was still issued a deportation order.
Clifford Cornell – In January 2009, Cornell experienced some legal events. On February 4, 2009 Cornell "was arrested on Wednesday after crossing the border from Canada into Washington State". On February 23, 2009, Cornell was charged with the crime of desertion with the intent to "avoid hazardous duty and shirk important service". On April 29, 2009, Clifford was convicted of desertion and sentenced to one year in prison.
Kimberly Rivera – On August 11, 2009, she was granted a new "Pre Removal Risk Assessment" hearing with a new officer. However, she was deported on September 20, 2012. She was sentenced to ten months' imprisonment and a bad conduct discharge.

Objectors who had not applied for legal refugee status

Daniel Sandate – Deported at Niagara Falls, Canada on July 16, 2008, after having been in Canada for over 2 years. He was later court-martialed at Ft. Carson and given an 8-month prison sentence. Sandate released a written statement in prison about his opposition to the war in Iraq. He was released on January 20, 2009, at Ft. Sill, Oklahoma, and spoke publicly about his experience at a press conference in Oklahoma City on January 22, 2009.
James Ashley – On December 23, 2008, the '"Toronto Star reported the following: "A 28-year-old man accused of deserting the U.S. army has been caught by Canadian police and turned over to U.S. authorities in Michigan. James Ashley was returned to the United States on Monday at the Blue Water Bridge in Port Huron. U.S. Customs spokesman Ron Smith says it's not clear if police caught Ashley at the bridge or elsewhere in Ontario. Smith says there's an arrest warrant for Ashley out of Fort Riley, Kansas." It is unclear whether or not  Ashley had intended to legalize his status by pursuing a refugee claim with the Immigration and Refugee Board of Canada, or whether he had yet to do so.  (See Immigration and Refugee Protection Act.)

Objectors who willingly returned to the US without deportation order
Ivan Brobeck – Refused second tour in Iraq, USMC; returned to the USA to face court marshal for unauthorized absence and missing movement at Quantico in 2006. Ivan was given a 10 month sentence reduced to 63 days due to a pre-trial agreement. Brobeck received a bad conduct discharge.
Darrell Anderson – Fled to Canada after 7 months in Iraq. Returned to US without court-martial.
 James Burmeister – Returned to US, turned himself in to authorities, was convicted of desertion July 16, 2008, and was sentenced to 9 months in prison. He was released October 28, 2008, after three months and 10 days in prison.

Objectors claiming the war is illegal

Ben Griffin – British SAS soldier who believes the war in Iraq was illegal and that the government lied about the war's conduct. He was allowed to leave the army with no charges filed against him.
Malcolm Kendall-Smith – A British unit medical officer for the RAF who refused to deploy on the belief that the war was unlawful. He was charged with and convicted of 5 counts of refusing a lawful order. The judge in his case rejected the defense that the war was illegal, saying that the UK armed forces had full justification under United Nations resolutions to be in Iraq at the time of the charges and that a crime of aggression could not be carried out by such a junior officer.
Wilfredo Torres
Ehren Watada

Conscientious objectors
For purposes of this list, the determination of conscientious objection is made by the individual, not a government. It is frequently the case that individuals and governments disagree on the status.

Agustin Aguayo (Amnesty International Prisoner of Conscience)
Kevin Benderman – Served one tour in Iraq then applied for conscientious objector status before his second tour. He was acquitted of desertion and found guilty of missing a troop movement. He was sentenced to 15 months in prison, demoted to private and given a dishonorable discharge.
Former Army interrogator Ricky Clousing
Diedra Cobb
Aidan Delgado – He applied for conscientious objector status in April 2003, which the Army eventually recognized, and he was honorably discharged in April 2004.
Stephen Funk
Katherine Jashinski
Clifton Hicks
Camilo Mejía
Pablo Paredes – A Navy sailor who refused to board the USS Bonhomme Richard as it deployed to the Persian Gulf on December 6, 2004. A court martial found him guilty of absence without leave.
Kimberly Rivera
Josh Stieber – Blogger and co-author of Letter to Iraq''

In June 2013, Josh Stieber and numerous celebrities appeared in a video showing support for Chelsea Manning.
 Abdullah William Webster (USA Amnesty International prisoner of conscience
 Mark Wilkerson

Other

Michael Blake
Ivan Brobeck
Peter Brown
Thomas Buanomo
James Burmeister
Jonathan Arkis Cobb 
Chris Capps
Eugen Cherry
James Circello
Travis Clark
Pedro Fortunato "Kelso"
Joshua Despain
Jessica Faustner
Brad Gaskins
Chris Gorman
Abdul Henderson
Derek Hess
Clifton Hicks
Kevin Hicks
Eleonai 'Eli' Israel
Terri Johnson
Ghanim Khalil
Mohisin Khan
Joel Klemkewicz
Vincent LaVolpa
Blake Lemoine
Christopher Magaoay
Devon Marsh
Corey Martin
Jimmy Massey
Melanie McPherson
Matt Mishler
Linjamin Mull
Perry O'Brian
Ralph Padula
Korey Rowe
André Shepherd
Ross Spears
Michael Sudbury
Suzanne Swift
Ronnie Tallman
Harvey Tharp
Marc Train
Jose Vasquez
Hart Viges
Carl Webb
Jason Webb
Mark Wilkerson
Robert Zabala

Punishments given to Iraq War resisters

"***" – Was in Canada as an Iraq war resister

See also

General
2003 Invasion of Iraq
Canada and Iraq War Resisters
Nuremberg Defense
Opposition to the Iraq War
Post–September 11 anti-war movement
Protests against the Iraq war
The Right to Refuse to Kill

Links relevant to those claiming refugee status in Canada
Canadian immigration and refugee law
Canadian nationality law
Citizenship and Immigration Canada
Immigration to Canada
Jeffry House – attorney focusing on immigration issues
Permanent resident
Temporary resident
US Customs and Border Protection

References

External links
"We move to Canada" Blog (Canada)
Canada Border Services Agency

 
 
Conscientious objectors